is a former Japanese football player and he is current manager of Jubilo Iwata from 2023.

Playing career
Yokouchi was born in Fukuoka Prefecture on November 30, 1967. After graduating from high school, he joined Japan Soccer League club Mazda (later Sanfrecce Hiroshima) in 1986. He played many matches as offensive midfielder. In 1992, the Japan Soccer League folded and the new J1 League was founded. However he did not play in many matches due to an injury and retired at the end of the 1995 season.

Managerial career
After retirement, Yokouchi started coaching career at Sanfrecce Hiroshima in 1996. He mainly coached youth team until 2002. In 2003, he became a coach for top team. The club won the champions in 2012, 2013 and 2015 J1 League. In 2017, the club results were bad and manager Hajime Moriyasu was sacked in July. Yokouchi managed the club 1 match as caretaker.

On 25 December 2022, Yokouchi appointment manager of J2 relegation club, Jubilo Iwata for upcoming 2023 season.

Career statistics

Club

Managerial statistics
.

References

External links
 
 

1967 births
Living people
Association football people from Fukuoka Prefecture
Japanese footballers
Japan Soccer League players
J1 League players
Sanfrecce Hiroshima players
Japanese football managers
J1 League managers
Sanfrecce Hiroshima managers
J2 League managers
Júbilo Iwata managers
Association football midfielders